Anders Burvall (born 25 October 1964) is a Swedish sports shooter. He competed in the men's 10 metre air rifle event at the 1988 Summer Olympics.

References

External links
 

1964 births
Living people
Swedish male sport shooters
Olympic shooters of Sweden
Shooters at the 1988 Summer Olympics
Sportspeople from Uppsala
20th-century Swedish people
21st-century Swedish people